The Regency of Tunis may refer to:

 Ottoman Tunisia (1574-1705)
 Beylik of Tunis (1705-1881)

History of Tunisia